Bimiini is a tribe of beetles in the subfamily Cerambycinae, containing the following genera and species:

 Genus Adalbus
 Adalbus crassicornis Fairmaire & Germain, 1859
 Genus Bimia
 Bimia bicolor White, 1850
 Bimia waterhousei Pascoe, 1864
 Bimia semiflava Saunders, 1850
 Genus Lautarus
 Lautarus concinnus (Philippi & Philippi, 1859)
 Genus Phantazoderus
 Phantazoderus frenatus Fairmaire & Germain, 1864
 Genus Sybilla
 Sybilla coemeterii (Thomson, 1856)
 Sybilla flavosignata Fairmaire & Germain, 1859
 Sybilla integra Fairmaire & Germain, 1859
 Sybilla krahmeri Cerda, 1973
 Sybilla livida Germain, 1900
 Genus Zehra
 Zehra coemeterii (Thomson, 1856)

References

 
Polyphaga tribes